Early Americans is a studio album by American jazz saxophonist Jane Ira Bloom. The album was released on May 13, 2016, by Outline Records label. This is her 16th album as a band leader. The album received the Grammy Award for Best Immersive Audio Album in 2018.

Reception
Mark Sullivan of All About Jazz wrote, "The whole program is full of variety, beautiful and exploratory at the same time. The trio format works so well that it is surprising that Bloom hasn't used it before. I'd love to hear more from these three." Alain Drouot of DownBeat stated, "The saxophonist could not have produced such startling results if she had not first assembled such a vital trio. Helias’ strumming, arco work and plucking reveal a wealth of subtleties and an endless variety, and Previte provides irresistible propulsion, rich and vivid with color." JazzTimes 's Britt Robson commented, "Nearly 40 years and now 16 albums into her career, the soprano saxophonist has the pellucid tone and timbre that merit the sunlight and scrutiny of a spare ensemble." Duck Baker of The Absolute Sound noted, "Bloom for her part sounds relaxed and masterful on this, her first trio date, delivering one of the most convincing documents in a long and valuable career." Britt Robson of JazzTimes wrote, "Bloom again asserts her status as the preeminent soprano in jazz.

Track listing

Personnel
Jane Ira Bloom – soprano saxophone
Mark Helias – bass
Bobby Previte – drums

References

External links

Jane Ira Bloom albums
2016 albums
Grammy Award for Best Immersive Audio Album